Carlos Vincente Bilbao (born November 14, 1936, in Emmett, Idaho - November 11, 2019) is a Republican Idaho State Representative since 2004 representing District 11 in the B seat. Redistricted to District 8, Bilbao had announced in December 2011 that he would seek its senate seat, but in February 2012 announced that he would retire.

Education
Bilbao graduated from Emmett High School, earned his associate degree in business from Orange Coast College, and earned his bachelor's degree in business management from the University of Washington.

Elections
2004 Bilbao challenged Republican Representative Gary W. Bauer in the May 25, 2004, Republican primary, winning by 43 votes with 2,496 votes (50.43%), and won the November 2, 2004, general election with 10,645 votes (70.2%) against Tom Gatfield (D).
2006 Challenged by Bauer in a rematch in the May 23, 2006, Republican primary, Bilbao won with 2,907 votes (55.7%) against Bauer, and was unopposed for the November 7, 2006, general election, winning with 11,446 votes.
2008 Bilbao won the four-way May 27, 2008, Republican primary with 3,330 votes (64.1%), and won the November 4, 2008, general election with 14,056 votes (77.1%) against Constitution Party nominee Paul Venable.
2010 Bilbao won the May 25, 2010, Republican primary with 3,181 votes (58.5%) against Thomas Munds, and won the November 2, 2010, general election with 11,260 votes (84.2%) against Libertarian nominee John Charles Smith.

References

External links
Carlos Bilbao at the Idaho Legislature
 

1936 births
Living people
Republican Party members of the Idaho House of Representatives
Orange Coast College alumni
People from Emmett, Idaho
University of Washington Foster School of Business alumni
United States Navy sailors